Hengyang East railway station is a railway station located in Zhuhui District, Hengyang, Hunan Province, China. It is on the Huaihua-Shaoyang-Hengyang railway, the Hengyang-Liuzhou intercity railway, and the Wuhan-Guangzhou high-speed railway, a segment of the Beijing–Guangzhou high-speed railway.

See also 

 Hengyang railway station

Railway stations in Hunan
Railway stations in China opened in 2009
Stations on the Wuhan–Guangzhou High-Speed Railway